The 2010 season was Bangkok Glass's 2nd season in the top division of Thai football. This article shows statistics of the club's players in the season, and also lists all matches that the club played in the season.

Team kit

Chronological list of events
10 November 2009: The Thai Premier League 2010 season first leg fixtures were announced.
7 July 2010: Bangkok Glass is kicked out of the FA Cup in the third round by Rajnavy Rayong.
24 October 2010: Bangkok Glass finished in 5th place in the Thai Premier League.

Squad

Transfers
In

Out

Out on loan

Matches

League

League table

FA Cup

Third round

League Cup

First round

1st Leg

2nd Leg

Second round

1st Leg

2nd Leg

Singapore Cup

Round of 16

Quarter-final

1st Leg

2nd leg

Glass won 6–4 on aggregate.

References

2010
Bangkok Glass